Dos-à-dos (French for "back-to-back") may refer to:

Dosado or do-si-do, dance move
Dos-à-dos binding of two books into one volume
Dos-à-dos (carriage)